This list contains the names of albums that contain a hidden track and also information on how to find them. Not all printings of an album contain the same track arrangements, so some copies of a particular album may not have the hidden track(s) listed below. Some of these tracks may be hidden in the pregap, and some hidden simply as a track following the listed tracks. The list is ordered by artist name using the surname where appropriate.

 Katy B, On a Mission: "Water" after a five-minute silence on the track "Hard to Get."
 B2K, Pandemonium!: After "Dog" by Jhene, a fan favorite " What U Get" follows on some versions of the CD.
 The Backstreet Boys, For The Fans CD 3 contains Krystal Harris' "My Religion" after "All I Have To Give [A Capella]."
 Bad Astronaut, Acrophobe: after the track "Unlucky Stuntman" several telephone calls
 Bad Religion:
 Age of Unreason: Some versions of the album have the song "The kids are alt-right" hidden on track 14 after "What tomorrow brings". But this is not the last track of the album, track 15 contains "The profane rights of man" but this one is mentioned as a bonus on the back cover.
 Bamboo, We Stand Alone Together: after "Tatsulok," short silence, then a short instrumental, then a cover of Sting's "Englishman in New York."
 Barenaked Ladies:
 Gordon: After "Crazy," a number of studio outtakes and ad-libs occur. This track is sometimes called "Dat Fodder."
 Rock Spectacle: "Sweetest Woman" and "Uncle Elwyn," two famous Barenaked Ladies 'ad-libs', follow on from "If I Had $1,000,000" after a minute's silence
 Stunt: "She's on Time" and "Long Way Back Home" is a bonus track following "When You Dream" on some versions of the CD.
 Maroon: "Hidden Sun" follows on after "Tonight is the Night I Fell Asleep at the Wheel" on some versions of the CD.
 Everything to Everyone: Acoustic versions of "Another Postcard," "Maybe Katie" and "Second Best" appear on three bonus tracks on the Limited Edition.
 Basement Jaxx
 Atlantic Jaxx Recordings (1997): Unlisted an untitled intro track on track 1.
 Camberwell (2000): The sound of someone pretending to be Queen Elizabeth II, opening the sewage works in Camberwell, is hidden at the end of Side A.
 Crazy Itch Radio (2006): Hidden track "Night Moves On" follows track 14 "U R on My Mind" at 04:44
 That same album also contains a hidden enhanced element featuring an MP3 file for "Oh My God"
 Basshunter, Bass Generation: Hidden track "Numbers" follows on from "Every Morning (Michael Mind Edit)" after five minutes of silence.
 Billy Bauer: Plectrist: Two incomplete takes of "Lover Come Back To Me" in pregap, rewind about 9 minutes before track 1.
 The Beach Boys:
 Pet Sounds (Remastered CD): After the stereo version of "Caroline, No," there are a few seconds of silence followed by thirty seconds of an isolated background vocal track from "Wouldn't It Be Nice."
 Good Vibrations: Thirty Years of The Beach Boys: At the end of Disc One is an unlisted multi-tracked demo rendition of "Happy Birthday Four Freshmen," performed by Brian Wilson. That rendition would later appear on Disc One of Hawthorne, CA, this time listed as track No. 3 of that 2-CD anthology.
 Hawthorne, CA: At the end of both discs is a hidden track. Disc One features a hidden excerpt of The Beach Boys singing a brief tribute to KFWB radio station in concert, followed by Mike Love saying "We usually call this one an intermission." Disc Two features an a cappella extract from "Heroes and Villains."
 Beach House:
 Bloom: Contains the hidden track Wherever You Go (starting at 13:30 of the final track)
 Beanbag: freesignal: Partial remixes of "Whiplash," "Bite the Hand," and "Happy Dispatch," connected by bits of static and songs from other stations on a radio dial, are found on an unlisted track 12, following a five-second "minus track" separating it from track 11, "Taste Test."
 Beastie Boys:
 "Root Down" EP: After a 32-second silence after "Something's Got to Give" is a special German and Japanese 30 second bonus. It features men talking about the Beastie Boys in German and Japanese while "So What'cha Want" plays in the background.
 Hello Nasty: In the pregap Between "The Move" and "Remote Control," there is a sample from "El Rey Y Yo" by the Los Angeles Negros mixed up with miscellaneous sound effects
 Another pregap can be heard between "Intergalactic" and "Sneakin' Out the Hospital." The pregap features Biz Markie Freestyling
 The Beatles:
 Sgt. Pepper's Lonely Hearts Club Band (1967): Several seconds after the final track "A Day in the Life," a loop of random edits and samples plays backwards. On the original vinyl, this looped endlessly (and could be arguably the first hidden track) as it was placed in the inner groove, however on CD it only loops about eight or nine times before fading out. The loop is preceded by a short note of very high pitch, played on a dog whistle. It also appears on the American version of the Beatles' compilation Rarities, and is listed as "Sgt. Pepper Inner Groove," as it had not appeared on the original American vinyl. The inner groove later inspired The Rolling Stones and The Who later in the year, and New Order in 1986, to include their own pieces inspired by the inner groove.
 There appear to be two vinyl versions of the inner groove: the original British pressing (black label with gold logo) has the inner groove play through the entire locked groove and does not include laughter at the beginning of the piece. The re-issue of the British pressing from 1987 (black label with silver logo) starts playing the inner groove long before the needle reaches the locked groove, includes the laughter and, once the needle hits the locked groove, the listener only hears the last two seconds of the piece played over and over again.
 The Beatles (The White Album) (1968): A snippet of "Can You Take Me Back," a short McCartney song, appears in between "Cry Baby Cry" and "Revolution 9." (Beatles fans and scholars disagree over whether "Can You Take Me Back" should be considered part of "Cry Baby Cry" or as a separate song, although it was recorded two months after "Cry Baby Cry"). The track is followed by some quiet dialogue (part of a conversation from the studio control room where Alistair Taylor asked George Martin for forgiveness for not bringing him a bottle of claret) which is furthermore is of debate concerning whether it is the start of "Revolution 9", the end of the hidden track or neither. On CD versions, "Can You Take Me Back?" shares its track number with "Cry Baby Cry", whilst the conversation excerpt shares its track number with "Revolution 9", and as such, it is often considered the start of the latter track.
 Abbey Road (1969): The 23 second track "Her Majesty" follows a fourteen seconds of silence at the end of the album. On CD issues, note, it is a separate track (track 17) and is listed on the back cover. The song was originally intended to appear earlier on the album as part of the "medley" on side two, but Paul McCartney decided it did not feed and the song was edited out by tape operator John Kurlander. He was instructed by McCartney to destroy the tape, but EMI policy stated that no Beatles recording was ever to be destroyed. The fourteen seconds of silence between "The End" and "Her Majesty" are the result of Kurlander's lead-out tape added to separate the song from the rest of the recording. It was only when The Beatles liked the unintentional placement of the song at the end that they allowed for it to be kept.
 1962–1966 (1973): Original UK Vinyl copies feature unlisted whispering between the songs "Eight Days a Week" and "I Feel Fine", or more specifically as the intro to "I Feel Fine". This is considered to be the 'whispering intro' for "I Feel Fine" and only appears on the original UK vinyl copies of 1962–1966 and on the 2014 vinyl remaster.
 Free as a Bird (1995): At the end of track 4, "Christmas Time (Is Here Again)," the song "Auld Lang Syne" plays on an organ while John Lennon reads out one of his "nonsense free verse poems."
 Anthology 3 (1996): After the final track on disc 2 (a remix of "The End") ends, the ending chord of "A Day in the Life" is played backwards and then forwards. It shares the same track number as the remix.
 Love (2006): Love features parts of 130 individual commercially released and demo recordings of The Beatles although only 37 are listed. A notable one of these unlisted tracks is the song "Good Night," which gives a peaceful close to the album at the end of "All You Need is Love." Others include "Can You Take Me Back?," previously a hidden track on The Beatles (The White Album), appears at the end of the "Come Together" track.
 On the American versions of Help! and 1962–1966 is a rare mini-track, which was Ken Thorne's version of the James Bond Theme, played as the first track on Help! and the first track on the third side of 1962–1966. On both albums, the song "Help!" follows.
 The Beautiful South, Gaze: "Loneliness" appears at the end of the last listed track, "The Last Waltz".
 Beck:
 Mellow Gold: "Analog Odyssey" appears a few minutes after "Blackhole."
 Stereopathetic Soulmanure: There are 2 unlisted tracks. "Ken" is a short snippet of dialogue on track 24. There is also bonus noise on track 25 on most discs, but not all. The bonus noise features a reversed song called "In The Clover."
 Odelay: There is a loop of electronic noise called "Computer Rock" a few minutes after "Ramshackle." Alternate pressings contain the bonus tracks "Diskobox" or "Clock."
 Mutations: "Diamond Bollocks" appears after a few minutes of silence at the end of the album. Some other versions, such as the UK one, do not feature "Diamond Bollocks" as a hidden track and list it as track 12 since track 13 is the bonus track "Runners Dial Zero".
 Midnite Vultures: The album contains non-song noise at three points: 25 seconds of robotic sounds between tracks 3 and 4; 9 seconds of spray-painting noise between tracks 9 and 10, and; 1:04 of hidden electronic noise 7 minutes after final track "Debra."
 Daniel Bedingfield, Second First Impression: "I'm Not Dead!," an upbeat track referring to his near-death in a recent car accident, plays after the end of the 'regular' tracks on the album.
 Natasha Bedingfield:
 Unwritten: "Sojourn" begins after the final listed track "Wild Horses" in the US edition, and after the track "Peace of Me" in the UK edition.
 N.B.: After the final track, there are two hidden tracks, "Loved By You" and "Lay Down."
 Bee Gees, Size Isn't Everything: Last track, Decadance contains two tech-remix of the 1976 recording 'You Should Be Dancing'
 Behemoth:
 Pandemonic Incantations: Track 66 is the untitled hidden outro (tracks 9–65 have no audio content).
 Satanica: This album was released with 2 hidden tracks. The first hidden track #33 is an instrumental track, while #93 is a short non-instrumental track but containing lyrics which are nowhere to be found. The tracks 9–32, as well as tracks 34–92 are silent/blank tracks, lasting 0:04 each.
 Thelema.6: Unlisted track 23 "The End" (tracks 12–22 have no audio content).
 Bela B.
 Bingo: "Theme from Bingowings" in the pregap of "B-Vertüre"
 Code B: A recording of Lee Hazlewood speaking about his collaboration with Bela B. in the pregap of "Rockula"
 Belle and Sebastian, 3.. 6.. 9 Seconds of Light/Push Barman to Open Old Wounds: After "Put the Book Back on the Shelf," a short song, "Songs for Children (On the Radio)" follows.
 Ben Folds Five, Whatever and Ever Amen: The hidden track, a message by Ben Folds about Ben Folds, appears at 5:28 of the final track on the original album, but is found in the pregap on remasters.
 The Benjamin Gate: Contact: The hidden track is a reprise of the song "The Calling." The reprise version is the radio edit, which contained a heavier mix of the song.
 BENEE, Hey u x: On the CD version of the album, a hidden track, "Make You Sick", follows the final listed track, "C U".
 Bent, The Everlasting Blink: On Track 11, after "Thick Ear" ends, there is about 9 minutes of silence, then 3 hidden bonus tracks: "12 Bar Fire Blues", "Wendy" and "Day-Care Partyline".
 Beth Hart, Screamin' For My Supper:  On Track 13, "Favorite Things" ends at 3:25, then silence until 3:50 when the hidden track "House of Sin" begins.
 The Berzerker:
 Dissimulate (album): Nulltrack: instrumental version of "Compromise". Track 13 is silence and not listed on the rear cover.
 World of Lies: Track 13 "............." is silence and not listed on the rear cover but there is in the booklet.
 Better Than Ezra:
 Deluxe: A hidden, untitled track begins playing after 2 minutes and 10 seconds of silence following the final listed track, "Coyote."
 Friction, Baby: "Mejor de Ezra" was placed in the negative space of track one, "King of New Orleans" on original pressings and tacked onto the final track on later pressings.
 Between the Buried and Me, The Silent Circus: "The Man Land" begins at 11:15 into "The Need for Repetition."
 Beyoncé:
 B'Day: "Encore for the Fans/Listen/Get Me Bodied (Extended Mix)." After the last track on the album, these three tracks follow right after, making the last track on the album actually over 10 minutes long. On the Deluxe edition, the hidden track is "World Wide Woman." If the album was bought at Best Buy, another hidden track followed, titled "First Time."
 Dangerously in Love: "Daddy," the final track, is hidden on the non-US version of the album.
 Beyoncé: Two hidden tracks in between songs: "Ghost" is tracked onto the beginning of the second track, "Haunted", and "Yoncé" is tracked onto the beginning of the sixth track, "Partition".
 Biffy Clyro:
 Infinity Land: "Tradition Feed" follows a long silence at the album's conclusion.
 The Vertigo of Bliss: "Ewan's True Mental You" plays approx. 30 seconds after the final track.
 Puzzle: "2/15ths" in the pregap between tracks 4 and 5 and "4/15ths" in the pregap between tracks 8 and 9. Also, the first minute and 25 seconds of "Living Is a Problem Because Everything Dies" is separated on the US edition and re-titled "Intro."
 Bif Naked, Purge: On some pressings of the album, a club remix of "I Love Myself Today" and its instrumental club mix appear back to back on the same track as "Religion."
 Big Brovaz, Nu-Flow: There is a cover version of "My Favorite Things"
 Bizzy Bone, Heaven'z Movie: Last track "Social Studies" contain a hidden skit towards the last few minutes towards the ending, noticing the actual track is 5 and some minutes long but CD has the track length for 11 minutes, having a long pause between the track itself and the skit.
 The Black Angels
 "Surf City (Revisited)" and "Paladin's Last Stand" are two tracks that are both unlisted and located on the last side of third disc of the LP version of their second album, Directions to See a Ghost. The last side of the third disc features a red psychedelic design yet does not list these tracks whatsoever.
 Passover: A cover of Jimmy Cliff's "Vietnam" is hidden after "Call to Arms"
 The Black Crowes, Shake Your Money Maker: "Mercy Sweet Moan (Live Too Fast Blues)" is played as an unlisted 11th track.
 The Black Eyed Peas:
 Behind The Front: "Leave It All Behind" a few seconds after the last track "Positivity"
 Bridging The Gap: "Empire Strikes Black (BEP Empire Remix)" about one minute after "Request Line"
 Elephunk: "Third Eye" at the end of the album
 Monkey Business: The hidden tracks "So Real" and "Change" appear after the tracks "My Humps" and "Audio Delite at Low Fidelity," respectively.
 Black Label Society, Mafia: After the song "Dirt on the Grave" the Lynyrd Skynyrd cover of "I Never Dreamed" plays.
 Lewis Black, The Carnegie Hall Performance: An untitled track appears in the pregap of the first disc of the album.
 Black Lipstick: Converted Thieves: The bonus track bears the title "Bonus Track." No idle choice, the song actually references the delight of a fan hearing a favorite band play the "bonus track" at a concert.
 Black Midi, Cavalcade: There is an unlisted introduction track on physical versions of the album before "John L".
 Black Moth Super Rainbow:
 Dandelion Gum features a bonus and unlisted track after "Untitled Roadside Demo."
 Start a People features a "{Super Secret Track}" after "Smile Heavy." In the bonus-reissue released version, it was revealed the name was "The Primary Color Movement" [which was originally on Electric Avenue, Chapter 8 by Duotone Records].
 Black Rebel Motorcycle Club:
 Howl: The song "Open Invitation" follows "The Line" at the end of the album.
 Take Them On, On Your Own: The instrumental title track for the album appears in the pregap before "Stop."
 Black Sabbath, Sabotage: "Blow on a Jug" follows on from "The Writ," at a much lower volume
 Perry Blake: Songs for Someone: "Chestnuts" follows the final track "Coming Home"
 Sarah Blasko, The Overture & The Underscore: "Long Time" appears after 5 minutes of silence at the end of the final track, "Remorse"
 Black Rebel Motorcycle Club's 2005 album Howl has a hidden track called "Open Invitation" after the last song printed on the CD, "The Line."
 Blessthefall, His Last Walk: The hidden song, "Purple Dog," is at 6:45 of final track, "His Last Walk."
 Blind Melon, Soup: Features "Hello Goodbye" in the pregap before "Galaxie."
 Blink-182:
 Blink-182: After "Violence" is a reading of a letter which fades into the next song "Stockholm Syndrome."
 The Mark, Tom, and Travis Show (The Enema Strikes Back!): after The 20th Track, "Man Overboard," there are 29 hidden tracks of Blink-182's on-stage banter all from different shows.
 Take Off Your Pants and Jacket: For a limited period, there were 3 editions of the Take Off Your Pants and Jacket Disc, each with 2 unique hidden tracks (one proper song and one joke song). After the limited period, all discs contained one of the 6 total hidden tracks, "Time to Break Up."
 Blla Blla Blla: After "Reggae për iriçin," the final track on their debut self-titled album in 2000, running water and an isolated vocal track from the opening track, "Send i mirë," can be heard. It repeats for 4 minutes then fades out. "Reggae për iriçin" itself runs 6 minutes.
 Bloc Party:
 Silent Alarm: "Every Time Is The Last Time" is hidden in the pregap on the UK and US versions of the album and after track 13 on European versions.
 Silent Alarm Remixed: "Tulips (Club Version)" is featured after silence after the final listed track.
 Blood Duster:
 Str8 Outta Northcote: Track 22 is untitled and hidden.
 Cunt: An untitled hidden track appears in the pregap before the first track.
 D.F.F.: Contains four hidden tracks. "TheSpiritOfSoreThroatHasLongSinceDied" and "PainfulNoiseEntitled"Htabbaskcalb"" are hidden in the pregap. "Htabbaskcalb Part 2" appears at the end of track 4. Track 6 is untitled and silent.
 Blood Duster: An untitled hidden track in the pregap before track 1.
 SixSixSixteen: There are two untitled hidden tracks at the end of the CD.
 Bloodhound Gang: Each of their studio albums contain a hidden track. Aside from Use Your Fingers, a period of silence follows the final song, then goes into the hidden track. The Hidden tracks can range from three seconds (Hefty Fine), to eight minutes (One Fierce Beer Coaster).
 Blue Man Group, The Complex: "Hidden Mandelbrot" / "Mandelbro7" / "Mandelbrot 4" follows on from final track "Exhibit 13"
 Blue October:
 Foiled: "It's Just Me" follows two minutes of silence at the end of the album
 History For Sale: An early, more acoustic version of "Calling you" is hidden at the end of the album, after several minutes of silence.
 Bluetones, Return to the Last Chance Saloon: "A Woman Done Gone Left Me" (instrumental) the track starts at 13:04 of the final track then continues until 15:49.
 Blur:
 Modern Life Is Rubbish: At the end of track 7 is the song "Intermission" and at the end of the final track (track 14) is the song "Commercial Break." These are credited, but without track numbers, making it unknown how they were to appear.
 Modern Life Is Rubbish (American version): This version features several tracks with a few seconds of silence (tracks 18 to 67 on the CD), followed by two British B-sides ("When the Cows Come Home" and "Peach") as "hidden tracks" on tracks 68 and 69.
 The Great Escape: After thirty seconds of silence at the end of the final track (track 15, "Yuko & Hiro") is a short untitled instrumental commonly known as "Ernold Same (Reprise)," as it resembles another song on the album called "Ernold Same."
 Blur: At the end of track 14 (the final track, "Essex Dogs") is a hidden track "Interlude," which starts at 6:23. On the US version, another hidden track titled "Dancehall" appears between "Essex Dogs" and "Interlude." On Japanese versions, "Dancehall" is made a separate listed bonus track as track 15 with "Interlude" after it has a hidden track.
 13: There are short tracks at the end of six tracks on the album. These are the untitled track (also known as "Space is the Place") at 3:23 into "Bugman", the organ instrumental at the end of "Coffee & TV" (which even plays in its music video), the short instrumental at the end of "B.L.U.R.E.M.I.", the rock instrumental at the end of "Battle," another rock instrumental at the end of "Trailerpark," and the two hidden tracks at the end of "Caramel" (the second of these begins with the sound of a car starting and starts directly after the previous one, and starts at 7:02 into the song). These hidden tracks are known as the "exitludes" of 13.
 Think Tank: "Me, White Noise" is hidden in the album's pregap, bringing the pregap's length to six minutes and fifty seconds. In between tracks 7 and 8 is another pregap, this time a short one of background chatter – another one of these short pregap appears between tracks 9 and 10, this pregap featuring a low quality excerpt of music.
 Starshaped (video album): On the original version of this live VHS release, "Luminous" is credited, but "Inerita" plays. Additionally, the DVD version features the US music video of "There's No Other Way" as a hidden easter egg. When on the menu screen, there is a star next to the word "Starshaped" which plays the video.
 Girls & Boys: Track 2 is "Magpie," but the back cover credits it as "People in Europe."
 Bon Jovi:
 100,000,000 Bon Jovi Fans Can't Be Wrong: (2004) The original, unreleased demo for "Livin' On A Prayer" is hidden after "Nobody's Hero," the last track of disc 4.
 Have A Nice Day:(2005) "Dirty Little Secret" is hidden at the end of the U.S. version of the album, after the duet with Jennifer Nettles from Sugarland
 Boo Radleys, Kingsize: a minute of melodic vocoder sounds appears at the album's pregap; rewind to before the beginning of track 1
 David Bowie:
 Space Oddity (1969): At the end of the second track, an unlisted 40-second jam called "Don't Sit Down" is heard.
 iSelect contains thirty seconds of silence at the end of track 11, a usual sign for the start of a hidden track.
 Bowling for Soup, A Hangover You Don't Deserve: A track of the band in the studio joking around titled "Ohio" and Belgium appear after various blank tracks.
 Boy George, U Can Never B2 Straight: Hidden track "Out of Fashion" in a 6 minutes acoustic form, placed about 30 seconds after last official track No. 15, "Bow Down Mister."
 Boy Kill Boy, Civilian: The hidden track "Exit" plays after 5:37 minutes of the final listed track, Shoot Me Down.
 Brand New::The Devil and God Are Raging Inside Me: Overlapping phone conversations are in the pregap. Part of phone conversation at the end of track 5:Limousine (MS Rebridge)
 Brandy, Human: After the final track "Fall," there is a hidden outro of Brandy singing the chorus of "Camouflage" a Capella.
 Breaking Benjamin
 Saturate: "Forever" at the end of the album
 We Are Not Alone: Contains an unlisted twelfth track, "Rain (2005 Version)."
 Phobia: Contains an unlisted fourteenth track, "The Diary of Jane (Acoustic)."
 Abs Breen, Abstract Theory: "One And Only," 7 minutes after the final track
 Brian Davis: Somebody Else's Radio: After the final song (All Night Long), there is silence for a minute and ten seconds. After this, an unlisted song starts playing.
 Edie Brickell & New Bohemians, Shooting Rubberbands at the Stars: "I Do" (Track 12). Appears in the track listing for new copies and on streaming services, but is unlisted in the track listings for the original 1988 release.
 Bright Eyes, Letting Off the Happiness: Has a hidden version of "Contrast and Compare" at the end of the album after "Tereza and Thomas."
 Sarah Brightman
 La Luna: "Moon River" is a hidden song composed by Henry Mancini and lyrics by Johnny Mercer after the final track, La Luna.
 Symphony: "Fleurs du Mal (Reprise)," after the final track.
 Brigitte, Et vous, tu m'aimes ? has the hidden track “Encore un verre”, following 2 silent minutes after “Jesus sex symbol”, at the end of the album.
 British Sea Power "Open Season" has the hidden track "Wilde is a Wanker" in the pre-gap before the first track "It Ended on an Oily Stage."
 Marc Broussard, Carencro: "Gavin's Song" (Track 23) follows 11 silent tracks after "Let Me Leave"
 James Brown, Live at the Apollo, Volume II: A pregap track containing unreleased dialogue before the first track.
 Brokencyde, I'm Not A Fan, But The Kids Like It!: An untitled hidden track consisting of a man criticizing the group begins at the 6:48 mark of the final track, "I'm Sorry", after 9 seconds of silence.
 Brujeria, Marijuana: Unlisted track number 6. This is a radio advertisement.
 Brutal Truth:
 Extreme Conditions Demand Extreme Responses: An untitled hidden track after a few minutes of silence on the last track.
 Kill Trend Suicide: An untitled hidden track starts at the end of the final track.
BTS
Love Yourself 承 'Her': After a minute of silence following the final track on the album, an 8-minute skit will play, titled "Skit:Hesitation and Fear" followed by a hidden track titled ‘Sea.'
2 Cool 4 Skool: After the final track on the album has concluded a short skit will play, titled "Skit:On The Start Line" followed by the hidden track "Path."
 Buckcherry, Time Bomb: There's a thirteenth track not printed on the track listing and lyric booklet called "Open My Eyes."
 Buckethead
 Kaleidoscalp: Track 13, "She Sells Sea Shells by the Slaughterhouse," contains an untitled hidden track.
 The Elephant Man's Alarm Clock: Track 13, "Fizzy Lipton Drinks," contains an untitled hidden track.
 Bucks Fizz
 The Lost Masters 2: The Final Cut: Disc 1, end of last track: "Now You're Gone (deleted end section)," then "Laughter Show Theme," and "Funny Side Theme." Disc 2, end of last track: "Now Those Days Are Gone (Andy Hill demo)."
 Hand Cut: (Remastered Special Edition 2004) Hidden Extra contained is a 'Live Rock Medley'.
 The Ultimate Anthology: Hidden Track: a rare 'Live Rock Medley' from 1982 that was only ever released on flexiblue vinyl.
 The Lost Masters: 2 hidden tracks: 'Young Hearts' with lead vocals by member Shelley Preston. This version was unfinished. The second track was an a cappella version of 'You and Your Heart so Blue' with Cheryl Baker lead vocals. It was especially mixed for this release.
 Jimmy Buffett
 Banana Wind: "Treetop Flyer" at the end of the album
 Christmas Island: Following a long pause after the last song, Jimmy recites "Twas The Night Before Christmas"
 Busted, Busted: Track 13 is skipped in the track listing on the back cover. The song is actually an 18-second intermission, commonly known as "Extra Exceedingly Fitness"
 "Bush: Razorblade Suitcase has a 23-second outro after the song "Distant Voices." It is called "23 Seconds.""
 Buzy (band):  is track 13 at the end of the album, by the group's leader NAO. It was originally released as a solo single in 2003.
 Butthole Surfers
 "Weird Revolution" (2001), After "They Came In," there's 17 minutes and 52 seconds of silence and there's this untitled noise from 21:52–22:23 which lasts 31 seconds.
 "Humpty Dumpty LSD" (2002): After "DADGAD," there's a split second of silence and then there is a bonus track on most copies titled "[untitled Hidden Track]" but on some it's called "Track 17" on the CD version only.
 The Byrds
 "Sweetheart of the Rodeo": Found on the 1997 CD reissue. A minute after the last bonus track of "All I Have Are Memories" [Instrumental]" is a hidden bonus track consisting of a Sweetheart of the Rodeo radio spot.
 "The Notorious Byrd Brothers": On the 1997 CD reissue. After the last bonus track of "Universal Mind Decoder [Instrumental]," there is a short silence before a hidden track starts playing, featuring an advertisement and a piece of studio.

See also
 List of backmasked messages
 List of albums with tracks hidden in the pregap

References 

B